Labia pride (also termed labia liberation, vulvaversity and similar) is the promotion of a raised awareness of the appearance of female genitalia and the breaking of taboos surrounding the vulva, as carried out by feminist movements and advocacy groups. The name emphasizes the labia, as the trend towards cosmetic surgery on the female genitals (labiaplasty, also known as "designer vagina") has left many women insecure about the size and appearance of their labia. It is supported by several independent feminist groups and based on diverse channels of communication such as cyberfeminism, protest marches and advocating boycotts against physicians and clinics that make use of deceptive advertising.

Background

The vulva is associated with contradictory evaluations and meanings in western society. It is strongly sexualized as the object of erotic desire, but it is also often regarded as ugly, disgusting and unclean: something to be ashamed of and hide. Unveiling or talking about the vulva are considered obscene, offensive and taboo in most situations. The term vulva shaming is sometimes used for these phenomena. There are many stigmatizations and myths concerning the vulva. Many girls and women are insecure about the appearance of their genitals, but do not dare to bring up the topic with family and friends.

The Anthropologist Carlos Sulkin vividly depicts this connection as a culturally associative network, whereby the tabooing of the vulva and problematic ideals of beauty are closely linked. There is a cultural norm in western societies to keep the vulva covered and concealed in public, to hide it and avoid it as a topic. In this context, unrealistic ideas of perfection and normativity thrive:

In many cultures, however, we also often find the opposite tendency to identify the vulva with powerful, mythical forces. This valuation of the vulva is found for both ancient European and non-European cultures. In these mythologies, for example, the belief prevails that disaster can be averted through the self-determined uncovering of the vulva, referred to as Anasyrma. This practice was used both in religious rituals, but was practiced in the context of secular festivals. Public exposure of the vulva became an act of empowerment.

Anasyrma has inspired modern feminist activists and has been incorporated in art projects and workshops such as Raising the Skirt and Anasyrma Army. The taboos and shame that affect the vulva in Western society are to be conquered and women are to find a relaxed way of dealing with the vulva again.

Aims and objectives 

The campaigns are intended to educate, empower and raise critical awareness about natural genital variation. Activists and supporters encourage women (and also men) to develop more positive attitudes towards the vulva and to accept anatomical variations as they are. Campaigners believe that the vulva should be seen as a normal part of the body that does not need to be hidden and made taboo, and that women should embrace that part of their body and stop being ashamed of their vulva.

The aim is to educate men and women about normal female anatomy and its variations and break taboos surrounding the vulva. To achieve this, the vulva is recontextualized, for example, through public display and discourse in explicitly non-sexual contexts.

Resolving vulva shaming 
Although the vulva is still a taboo in today's society, it is subject to an unrealistic ideal of beauty. Unlike most other parts of the body, the vulva is usually covered in public and hidden from the gaze of others, as expressed in the term "private parts". Most heterosexual girls and women rarely see other vulvas besides their own. Male adolescents are often familiar with the appearance of vulvas only through pornographic images.  Thus, for many people of both sexes, there are no realistic standards or possibilities for comparison.

Taken together, these are the conditions for which many women:
have a negative self-perception of their vulva and feel they have to be ashamed of it, and 
for which unrealistic beauty standards develop. While such ideals exist for numerous body regions, most of which are also far from average, there is little or no opportunity to correct or relativize these standards through social comparison.

Addressing unrealistic beauty standards 
The growing demand for labiaplasty surgery could be attributed to the fact that many women, as well as men, have unrealistic expectations regarding genital appearance. The cultural norm of covering the genitals in public creates a lack of a standard of comparison. Most explicit depictions of female genitalia that people are confronted with are produced by the sex industry. Pornography is usually produced in a commercial context and primarily addresses male customers. Therefore, these depictions of female genitalia are often "beautified" to suit commercial need (or in some countries for legal reasons), either by the selection of models with a certain anatomy or by photoshopping the images. In practice, this means smoothing out irregularities and "digitally shortening" the labia minora.

A 2020 study of 4.513 men and women directly addressed the question of what aesthetic preferences both sexes have regarding the vulva. For this purpose, photos of vulvas with and without labiaplasty were shown, and the participants were asked to rate them on the dimensions personal ideal (what they themselves consider ideal), societal ideal (what they think most other people consider to be ideal) and normalcy (how far does the depicted vulva correspond to the natural average). It was found that both men and women considered the vulvas after labiaplasty not only more attractive i.e. ideal (both societal and personal), but also more normal. This effect was even more pronounced for women than for men. Thus, vulvas with surgically removed or reduced labia minora were considered more normal than natural vulvas by most people. The authors conclude that:

The taboo and shameful public attitude towards the vulva is seen as the cause of these unrealistic expectations. Various initiatives aim to change this and want to the vulva to be treated in public presentation and conversation as a normal body part. Demands include that female genitalia be allowed to be depicted in the popular press (i.e. without the legal requirement of "photoshopping" the labia away, as is the case e.g. in Australia), that parents use the anatomically correct terms in conversation with their children, or that children's dolls such as Barbie not be shipped without vulvas (in fact, "Barbie style" is a common term for an extensive form of labiaplasty in which the labia minora are completely removed).

Forms of activism

Muff March 

The London-based feminist group UK Feminista organized a protest march through Harley Street, an area synonymous with its private medical providers, in December 2011. More than 320 women paraded the street, with slogans like: "Keep your mits off our bits!", "There's nothing finer than my vagina!", and "Harley Street puts my chuff in a huff"

The "Muff March" has been criticized for putting too much emphasis on pornography as a root cause of the problem. (See Feminist views on pornography.)

New View campaign 
New View is a New York City based, grassroots network of feminists, social scientists and health care providers. In a self-description, New View "is opposed to the growth of the unregulated and unmonitored genital cosmetic surgery industry that is medicalizing women's sexuality and creating new risks, norms and insecurities." The group initiated several events with the aim of empowering women and raising awareness for the topic under names such as the Vulvagraphics or Vulvanomics. These include workshops to "celebrate the role of art in activism and to kick off a campus-based movement to celebrate genital diversity", "flash activism" in front of surgeon's offices, conferences (Framing the Vulva) and street demonstrations.

Photo campaigns

Several feminist groups, such as Gynodiversity, the Large Labia Project, Courageous Cunts or 100 vulvas try to oppose the influence that pornography has on anatomic expectations. By encouraging women to release images of their vulvas and post photo submissions of anonymous vulvas on their websites, they want to establish a sphere for women to get realistic impressions of normal vulvas.

However, the campaign itself has been criticized. By giving the false impression that protruding labia are the anatomical norm and small inner labia are the adaptation to beauty standards, it ignores the fact that many women have naturally small labia:

Furthermore, these campaigns as well have been criticized for putting too much blame on the porn industry and the subjection to male desires. It is argued that even though this might be the case to a certain degree, other factors that boost these surgeries are basically ignored.

Courageous Cunts 

Courageous Cunts was a feminist website, founded in 2012, that focused on issues of body empowerment and genital self-awareness. Its primary concern was the critical reception of women's health issues, sexualized body images and the sexual objectification of female bodies. Courageous Cunts considered itself to be part of the labia pride movement, with the aim of raising awareness for critical issues around labiaplasty and empowering women to overcome body shame. The site ran a campaign during which women could publicly post photographs of their vulvas to promote a natural genital image and protest against "porn aesthetics". Using the word "cunt" as their name was an act of reappropriation, as English professor Germaine Greer argues that the ancient vulgarism "is one of the few remaining words in the English language with a genuine power to shock".

Vulvaversity 
Vulvaversity is a collective of committed artists and project makers, originating in the German city of Freiburg im Breisgau. The project is dedicated to demystifying the vulva and making it visible. The project clears up ideas of norms and wants to encourage people to overcome the shame regarding vulvas that has developed over many centuries. Vulvaversity wants to dispel the myth of the  vulva as it is portrayed in mainstream pornography in particular. As a vehicle for this visualization, Vulvaversity produced calendars, notepads, shopping lists, postcards. Vulvaversity deliberately refrains from aestheticizing or artistically depicting the photographed vulvas and thus shows unadulterated, unchanged images. The collective organizes film and discussion evenings, rooms for exchange, lectures and talks, and always provides the possibility to have a photo of one's own vulva taken in a mobile photo studio to have it published.

See also
Labia stretching, on the desirability of larger labia

Art projects
 Vagina and vulva in art (and also Clitoris in art and Erotic art)
 101 Vagina, an Australian photo-book self-published in 2013
 Femalia, an American photo-book edited by Joani Blank and first published by Down There Press in 1993
 The Dinner Party, an installation by Judy Chicago
 Megumi Igarashi, a Japanese artist who made a kayak out of a model of her vulva
 Jamie McCartney, a British artist best known for his work Great Wall of Vagina

Protests
 Femen
 LABIA
 Nudity and protest
 One Billion Rising

References

External links
Tiefer, L. (2019): Feminist Activism to Challenge the New Industry of Female Genital Cosmetic Surgery. Female Genital Cosmetic Surgery, 90–98.  
The "labia pride" movement - Salon
Guerilla Vulvas Take on Vaginal Rejuvenators - MsMagazine
Hungry Beast Episode 14: Labiaplasty - ABC

Feminist protests
Nudity and protest
Women's organisations based in the United Kingdom
Vulva
Pride